= The Cavanilles Institute =

Institute in Valencia, Spain

Coordinates: 39.5183°N 0.4249°W

Cavanilles Institute for Biodiversity and Evolutionary Biology Instituto Cavanilles de Biodiversidad y Biología Evolutiva
- Established: 1998
- Research type: University research institute
- Website: www.uv.es/icbibe

The Cavanilles Institute (Valencia) is located on the Parque Científico de Paterna, and was established in 1998 by the University of Valencia. The goal of this research center is to tackle questions relating to biodiversity from multiple perspectives, studying from morphology to animal behavior, from molecular genetic variation to quantitative variation, and integrating experts in complementary fields such as molecular biology, genetics, population biology, taxonomy, ecology, neurobiology or ethology.
